Nabatieh Governorate is one of the nine governorates of Lebanon. The area of this governorate is 1,058 km2. The capital is Nabatieh.

Districts
The governorate is divided into four districts (Aqdiya, singular qadaa) containing 116 municipalities.  The capitals are in brackets:
 Bint Jbeil (Bint Jbeil) – 36 municipalities
 Hasbaya (Hasbaya) – 16 municipalities
 Marjeyoun (Marjeyoun) – 25 municipalities
 Nabatiyeh (Nabatiyeh) – 39 municipalities

Religion in Nabatieh Governorate

See also
 Southern Lebanon
 Jabal Amel

References

 
Governorates of Lebanon